Normani Kordei Hamilton (born May 31, 1996) is an American singer and dancer.  She auditioned as a solo act for the American television series The X Factor in 2012, after which she became a member of the girl group Fifth Harmony, which went on to become one of the best-selling girl groups of all time. While in Fifth Harmony, Normani competed in Dancing with the Stars (2017) and released her first song outside of the group "Love Lies" (2018), a duet with Khalid. The song peaked in the top ten in the US, was certified 5× platinum by Recording Industry Association of America (RIAA), and is tied as the longest charting song by a female artist on the Mainstream Top 40 chart.

Following Fifth Harmony's indefinite hiatus, Normani released a two-song EP with Calvin Harris, Normani x Calvin Harris (2018). That same year, she released the single "Waves" featuring 6lack, which won Normani the MTV Video Music Award for Best R&B Video. Her duet with Sam Smith "Dancing with a Stranger" (2019), is one of the most-streamed songs by a female artist in the United Kingdom, and earned her a nomination for Song Of The Year at the Brit Awards. In August 2019, Normani released her first solo single, "Motivation". The following year, Normani released "Diamonds" with Megan Thee Stallion for Birds of Prey: The Album. In July 2021, Normani released "Wild Side", featuring Cardi B, which reached the top 20 in the US.

Early life 
Normani Kordei Hamilton was born on May 31, 1996, in Atlanta to Derrick and Andrea Hamilton. She has two older half sisters, Ashlee and Arielle. Raised in New Orleans she and her family relocated to Houston, Texas, after Hurricane Katrina in 2005. Normani attended private school as a child, and was homeschooled since sixth grade. From the age of three she competed in dance, gymnastics, and beauty pageants. She and her mother traveled between Houston and Los Angeles for acting, singing and dance auditions. She recorded a couple of songs, her first at age 13, and appeared in the HBO series Treme. Normani has said that dancing was her "first passion".

Career

2012–2018: The X Factor and Fifth Harmony 

Normani auditioned for the second season of The X Factor USA in 2012 with a performance of "Chain of Fools" by Aretha Franklin that earned approval from all four judges. She was cut during the second round of boot camp, but was invited back to the show to perform as part of a group with Ally Brooke, Lauren Jauregui, Dinah Jane, and Camila Cabello. That group, later naming itself Fifth Harmony, made it to the finale, finishing in third place.

In October 2013, Fifth Harmony released their first EP, Better Together. The group released their debut album, Reflection, in 2015, and their second album, 7/27, in 2016. The latter two albums spawned the hit singles "Worth It" and "Work from Home", respectively. After Cabello's departure from the group in December 2016, Fifth Harmony released their self-titled album as a quartet in August 2017. Time referred to them as arguably "the biggest girl group in the world" at the time. Normani became the quartet's de facto leader, leading solos and choreography. Her onstage confidence in the group caught the attention of executive Tunji Balogun, who founded RCA's imprint Keep Cool, and manager Brandon Silverstein, who began working with Normani in late 2017. On March 19, 2018, the group announced their decision to take an indefinite hiatus to pursue solo careers.

2015–2020: Solo projects

In 2015 Normani released two dance videos performing Future's "Fuck Up Some Commas" and Teyana Taylor's "Do Not Disturb" on her YouTube channel. From February 2016 through January 2017, Normani released covers of several songs, including Tory Lanez's "Say It" and mashups of Drake's "Fake Love"/"Sneakin'", and Solange's "Cranes in the Sky"/"Don't Touch My Hair", with the help of the producers The Invaders. Normani competed on season 24 of Dancing with the Stars from March through May 2017, alongside her dancing partner, professional ballroom dancer Valentin Chmerkovskiy. They reached the finals and finished in third place. In early August 2017, Normani had a cameo in singer Khalid's music video for "Young Dumb & Broke". In October 2017, it was announced that Normani had signed to management company S10 Entertainment as a solo artist. S10 Entertainment later partnered with Roc Nation to manage their artists, including Normani. She was also reported to have signed a publishing deal to Stellar Songs in early February 2018.

Normani's duet with Khalid, "Love Lies" from the soundtrack for romantic teen comedy-drama film Love, Simon (2018), was released in February 2018. It was included on the film's soundtrack of the same title, which was curated by Jack Antonoff. The song was considered a sleeper hit, reaching the top 10 on the Billboard Hot 100, and peaking at number 9 after charting for 28 weeks. "Love Lies" scored the highest first-week position for a single by a girl group member in the US, debuting at number 43 on the Billboard Hot 100. "Love Lies" reached number 1 on the Mainstream Top 40 chart, and charted for forty five weeks, tying the then record for longest charting song on the chart with Dua Lipa's "New Rules". The song was later placed on former U.S. President Barack Obama's 2019 year-end favorite songs list.

In April 2018, following Fifth Harmony's indefinite hiatus, it was announced that Normani had become the first ever artist to sign to Keep Cool/RCA Records, ahead of the release for her debut solo album. The following month, it was reported that Normani signed to a modeling contract with Wilhelmina. Over the next few months, Billboard announced that Normani was collaborating with Calvin Harris and Kehlani. In August 2018, Normani was featured alongside Kehlani on Jessie Reyez's remix to her song "Body Count", which was featured on Reyez's Grammy-nominated EP, Being Human in Public. She also appeared alongside Davido on Quavo's song "Swing", from his debut solo album Quavo Huncho (2018). That month, Normani signed on to a Puma campaign to endorse the brand's RS-0 shoes.

On October 22, 2018, Normani and Calvin Harris released their EP, Normani x Calvin Harris, which features the songs "Checklist" with Wizkid and "Slow Down". The following day, she performed the two songs alongside a new song, "Waves" featuring 6lack, at the Tidal X Brooklyn concert. She then released "Waves" and premiered it on the music radio station Beats 1 on November 15, 2018. The accompanying music video for "Waves" later won the reintroduced MTV Video Music Award for Best R&B Video. In December 2018, It was announced "Love Lies" was the most streamed song ever from a female artist by South Africa audiences on Spotify. Normani was also named the Top Female Breakout Artist of 2018 by Spotify. In her interview with Beats 1, Normani said that her debut album would be released in the first quarter of 2019, and its title is a number.

On January 11, 2019, Normani and Sam Smith released the song "Dancing with a Stranger", peaking at number 3 in the United Kingdom  and number 7 in the U.S. The song reached number 1 on the Adult Top 40 chart. It was the most-played global radio song in 2019, according to Forbes. The song earned her a nomination for Song of the Year at the 2020 Brit Awards. One year into her solo career, Normani became the fastest solo artist (without an album) to surpass one billion combined streams on Spotify. In March 2019, she was the supporting act for Ariana Grande's first leg of the Sweetener World Tour in North America. In April 2019, the singer made a surprise guest appearance during Khalid's Coachella Valley Music and Arts Festival performance set.

In May 2019, Normani was named the most discovered artist by Indian millennials on Spotify India in its first 60 days, since the app was made available in the country on February 26, 2019. Additionally, Billboard announced that she was the most-discovered artist that brings Z, X and Boomers together on Spotify. In August 2019, Normani performed a set at Lollapalooza music festival. Later that month, she released the single "Motivation", co-written by Grande, and her first single without a featured artist. The song reached the top 40 in multiple countries, including the U.S., where it peaked at number 33. Its accompanying music video earned praise from music critics who compared her choreography to artists like Michael Jackson and Britney Spears. E! News dubbed the music video as one of the pop culture moments that defined 2019.

In September 2019, Normani performed a dance sequence on the Savage X Fenty Show by Rihanna, which premiered on Amazon Prime Video. Normani then announced that her debut album would be released in 2020, stating "it is a little more than halfway" complete. Later that month, the singer joined The Voice as an advisor. In October 2019, The Guardian ranked her as one of the 25 greatest female pop-group performers of all time. The following month, Normani was announced as the first brand ambassador of Savage X Fenty. Normani collaborated with Ariana Grande and Nicki Minaj on the song "Bad to You", for the soundtrack of the 2019 film Charlie's Angels, released in November 2019. Normani teamed up with the National Basketball Association for a holiday themed commercial, which included her reinterpretation of "Winter Wonderland" called "Ballin' in a Christmas Wonderland".

In January 2020, Normani joined rapper Megan Thee Stallion on the song "Diamonds", which served as the lead single for the soundtrack of the superhero film Birds of Prey (2020). Normani was named in the Forbes 30 Under 30 list for 2020. In February 2020, she was listed on BET's "Future 40" list, which is a list of "40 of the most inspiring and innovative vanguards who are redefining what it means to be unapologetically young, gifted & black". In June 2020, Normani joined Urban Decay as a global citizen and a campaign spokesperson for the makeup brand. In August 2020, Normani made a cameo in Cardi B and Megan Thee Stallion's music video for "WAP", alongside Kylie Jenner and Rosalía.

2021–present: Upcoming debut album 
In March 2021, it was announced that "Dancing With a Stranger" was one of the most-streamed songs by a female artist in the United Kingdom ever. On July 15, 2021, Normani released "Wild Side", featuring Cardi B. The song peaked at number 14 on the Billboard Hot 100, and reached number 1 on the Mainstream R&B/Hip-Hop chart. In August 2021, Normani made a cameo in Baby Keem and Kendrick Lamar's music video for "Family Ties". That same month, it was announced that she would star in the 2022 Pirelli Calendar. Normani also performed "Wild Side" as a musical guest act on Rihanna's Savage X Fenty Show Vol. 3, which premiered on Amazon's Prime Video service on September 24, 2021. In October 2021, she partnered with Steve Madden for a reprisal of their 1990s "Big Head Girls" campaign. The campaign helped lead the company to their highest quarterly sales in history.

Normani was awarded Best Dance Performance for "Wild Side" at the 2021 BET Soul Train Music Awards on November 28, 2021. She did an interview with Entertainment Tonight following her win where she was asked if she had a message for her fans. She responded with "Summer's gonna be lit" referencing when her album will be released. That same month, Normani collaborated with Google for an interactive Black Friday campaign, that helped highlight black owned businesses. She also starred in its accompanying commercial titled Google: Black-Owned Friday, which was directed by Daps, and featured an original song by Normani alongside rapper T-Pain, that sampled "Wake Up Everybody" by Harold Melvin & the Blue Notes. For her contribution to the campaign, Normani received multiple accolades including the Webby Awards, Clio Awards, and D&AD Awards. The singer was also awarded Collaborator of the Year at the Variety Hitmakers Brunch on December 4, 2021, honoring the meticulously picked collaborations released by the artist, while simultaneously updating the fans on the reasoning behind her album delay in an interview conducted by Variety. 

Normani released "Fair" on March 18, 2022, and performed the song on The Tonight Show the day of its release. On April 6, 2022, the singer was announced as the face of Cracker Jill, for which she sang a reimagined version of the song "Take Me Out to the Ball Game", along with an accompanying music video. That same day, she was also announced as the face of AMI Paris' photo campaign for the French brand's L’Accordéon bag, according to Vogue France. On May 5, 2022, it was announced that Normani inked a publishing deal with Hipgnosis Songs Group. On June 6, 2022, Normani was featured on the remix of her childhood friend Josh Levi's song "Don't They". Later that month, Normani appeared in singer Chris Brown's music video for his song "WE (Warm Embrace)", though she received criticism from fans due to his extensive history of violence toward women.

On July 29, 2022, Normani released the single "New to You" alongside Calvin Harris, Tinashe and Offset, for Harris' album Funk Wav Bounces Vol. 2. In February 2023, she voiced the character Giselle, a member of the fictional '90s music group The Soul Vibrations, on the second season of the animated Disney+ television series The Proud Family: Louder And Prouder.

Artistry
Normani has a mezzo-soprano vocal range. Her music has primarily been described as pop, with elements of R&B, dance-pop, retro-pop, and hip hop. Normani has stated that she does not want to be musically limited and aims to be "genre-less".

Normani has taken inspiration from R&B and pop music of the 1990s and 2000s. She has also cited artist such as Aaliyah, TLC, En Vogue, Toni Braxton, Selena, Jhené Aiko, Destiny's Child, Mariah Carey, Janet Jackson, Beyoncé, Ciara, Lauryn Hill, and Britney Spears as influences.

Public image 
Writing of Normani's image, Vogue editor Lauren Valenti called her "the textbook definition of a bombshell". Several publications have referred to her as a "style icon". Elements of Afrofuturism have been incorporated in her fashion choices. Normani was voted among the sexiest female artist in pop in a 2018 poll by British radio network Capital. In 2022, she was placed on the Maxim Hot 100 list. Called an LGBTQ ally by The Hollywood Reporter, Normani was named an "up-and-coming gay icon" by Out.

In a 2020 cover story, Teen Vogue argued that Normani charted a "new territory that's rooted in relatability" for black women, while the singer proclaimed "I don't want to be so unattainable. I'm just the girl next door." The publication also noted the importance of her work with beauty and lingerie companies, and added that her resilience against the media's colorism "is for the black girls, who, like her, fail the brown-paper-bag test but are still a standard of beauty". Normani graced the cover of Rolling Stone's March 2020 Women Shaping the Future issue, alongside Megan Thee Stallion and SZA. Okayplayer and Uproxx named her among the black women who have redefined pop music, while The Recording Academy listed her as one of the black women who took pop music by storm and "reinvented the pop star ideal" in 2021. DeAsia Page of VICE stated that her success marked a shift "for an industry that tends to favor light-skinned Black women artists." 

In 2019, The Guardian ranked her as one of the 25 greatest female pop-group performers of all time. Forbes placed her on their 30 under 30 list for 2020. In a 2019 cover story for Cosmopolitan, music journalist Clover Hope credited Normani with reviving pop music by "injecting some sorely needed fun" in a time when the musical landscape was consumed with singles that garnered attention "because of "hidden" messages about exes". Writing for The New York Times, Lindsay Zoladz stated that "Motivation" broke through the "depressive haze of contemporary pop radio" at the time.

With her intensely choreographed dance routines, Normani has been cited as one of the artists instrumental in the revival of choreography-centric music videos in the late 2010s. Speaking on the state of dance and music in 2019, music choreographer JaQuel Knight stated "we have the City Girls putting it down for Miami, we have Atlanta bringing out so many different sounds, and then we have pop-stars; the Normani's are trying to bring dancing back into the industry." Normani has received praise for her dancing abilities from fellow artists Katy Perry, Rihanna, and Cardi B. WatchMojo placed her on their list of the "Top 20 Female Singers Who Can Dance". Further, Bustle declared that "there's virtually no better Gen Z dancer" than Normani. While Natty Kasambala of Dazed, wrote "since the launch of her solo career, she's consistently set the bar for pop visuals with elaborate choreography, trendsetting fashion and infectious hooks that stop people in their tracks."

Several of Normani's peers and contemporaries have cited her as an inspiration, including Zara Larsson, Lil Nas X, JoJo, Kelly Clarkson, CNCO, Becky G, Jessica Mauboy, WayV, and Dua Lipa. Drag queen June Jambalaya also named her as an inspiration for their career.

Philanthropy 
Along with Fifth Harmony, Normani was involved with the charities Girl Scouts of the US and the Ryan Seacrest Foundation. In September 2016, Normani was named the Diversity Ambassador for The Cybersmile Foundation, a non-profit organization providing support for victims of cyber bullying and online hate campaigns, after being racially abused online. In January 2017, Normani signed on to be the celebrity ambassador for the annual Stars & Strikes Celebrity Bowling Event & Tournament hosted by the Los Angeles charity A Place Called Home. In February 2017, it was announced that Normani partnered with American Cancer Society as a global ambassador to help increase awareness about the importance of breast cancer screening and HPV vaccination.

Personal life
Normani is a Christian. She resides in Los Angeles, California in the San Fernando Valley.

In August 2016, Normani was racially cyber bullied on social media after an interview she gave was "taken out of context". During the time, angry fans of her former bandmate Camila Cabello, perceived her to be throwing shade for referring to Cabello as "quirky". According to Normani, fans called her racial slurs including the N word, and photoshopped her images to depict her as a slave being "whipped, beaten" and lynched. The incident led her to temporarily deactivating her Twitter account.

In December 2019, racist Twitter and Tumblr post from 2012 shared by Camila Cabello when she and Normani were in Fifth Harmony resurfaced. In a February 2020 interview with Rolling Stone, Normani responded to the posts, writing: "I struggled with talking about this because I didn’t want it to be a part of my narrative, but I am a black woman, who is a part of an entire generation that has a similar story. It would be dishonest if I said that this particular scenario didn’t hurt me", she admitted. "It was devastating that this came from a place that was supposed to be a safe haven and a sisterhood [...] It took days for her to acknowledge what I was dealing with online and then years for her to take responsibility for the offensive tweets that recently resurfaced. Whether or not it was her intention, this made me feel like I was second to the relationship that she had with her fans. [...] I hope there is genuine understanding about why this was absolutely unacceptable".

Discography

Filmography

Awards and nominations 

As a solo artist, Normani has won  awards, including seven BMI awards, a Soul Train Music Awards, an MTV Video Music Award for Best R&B Video, a Webby Award and a Teen Choice Award. Overall, she has been nominated for  awards, including nominations for the Brit Award for Song Of The Year, and the People's Choice Award for Song of the Year.

Tours

Supporting act
Ariana Grande - Sweetener World Tour (2019)

References

External links 
 
 

 
1996 births
Living people
21st-century Christians
American female dancers
American mezzo-sopranos
American women pop singers
American contemporary R&B singers
Fifth Harmony members
Musicians from Atlanta
Musicians from Georgia (U.S. state)
Musicians from Louisiana
Musicians from New Orleans
Musicians from Houston
Musicians from Texas
Participants in American reality television series
RCA Records artists
The X Factor (American TV series) contestants
Christians from Georgia (U.S. state)
21st-century African-American women singers